The Bureau of Population, Refugees, and Migration (PRM) is a bureau within the United States Department of State.

It has primary responsibility for formulating policies on population, refugees, and migration, and for administering U.S. refugee assistance and admissions programs. The Bureau is headed by the Assistant Secretary of State for Population, Refugees, and Migration; this office is currently vacant. The current Bureau head is PRM Deputy Assistant Secretary Richard Albright in his capacity as Acting Principal Deputy Assistant Secretary. Albright has headed PRM since January 20, 2021.

The Bureau of Population, Refugees, and Migration (PRM) provides aid for and seeks to enhance the protection of refugees, victims of conflict and stateless people around the world, and manages the US Refugee Admissions Program to resettle refugees in the United States. PRM is a major funder of the UN Refugee Agency (UNHCR), the International Committee of the Red Cross (ICRC), the International Organization for Migration (IOM) and other aid groups. PRM also promotes the United States' population and migration policies in international fora and with other governments.

PRM's principal authorities derive from statutes, including the Migration and Refugee Assistance Act of 1962 and the Refugee Act of 1980.

History
The bureau's predecessor, the Bureau of Refugee Programs, began in late-1979. In 1993, the bureau added population issues to its portfolio, and the bureau was changed into its current form, the Bureau of Population, Refugees, and Migration.

Organization
The Bureau of Population, Refugees, and Migration is divided into ten unique offices.
Front Office
Office of the Comptroller
Office of the Executive Director
Office of Policy and Resource Planning
Office of Multilateral Coordination and External Relations 
Communicates U.S. policy in multilateral organizations, including UNHCR, the International Committee of the Red Cross, and the International Organization for Migration
Office of Refugee Admissions
Refugee Processing Center
Office of Population and International Migration 
Represents the United States in the United Nations Population Fund and the UN Commission on Population and Development
Office of Assistance for Africa
Office of Assistance for Europe, Central Asia, and the Americas
Office of Assistance for Asia and the Near East

References

External links
 

PRM
Refugees in the United States
Human migration
Population organizations
Government agencies established in 1993